netznetz was a social platform for individuals and groups associated with net art and net culture in Vienna, Austria. The platform was dissolved around 2011 because of internal problems and loss of funding from the city authorities of Vienna.

In a 3-day convention at the Künstlerhaus in October 2004 netznetz.net activists discussed and gathered opinions on the practices, collaborations and future of digital Vienna. The motto "Bring Your Own Devices" was a call beyond the individual scenes to both past and future participants, and offered access to new techniques and strategies in horizontal working situations.

netznetz.net suggested a new approach for the distribution of net culture funding to Vienna's city government.

Funding model 

Netznetz (also: Netznetz Mana) was a system for the distribution of municipal grants developed and run by netznetz in which the participants distributed their own funding according to certain democratically agreed rules and aided by custom software. It was run largely independent of the city government which provides the funds.

The system was striving for guaranteed and dispersed distribution of funding in the sector while the parameters of the distribution were meant to remain flexible, providing a dynamic scope. The aim was to encourage project-based collaborations by distributing various smaller grants. Therefore, everybody who was involved in the sector was subject to the principle of permanent reconfiguration of the system and the network.
The modular funding structure – developed in a drawn-out process of discourse and with the contribution of more than 30 groups – was boldly presented by the community and accepted by the municipal Commissioner for the Arts.

According to the new plan, 50% of the funding (250,000 euro, roughly US$300,000) was reserved for infrastructure (backbone projects), newbies (microgrants), and common representation (annual convention) and was to be distributed by the administration together with the community during the course of an open space conference.
The other half of the funding was to be distributed among the community by the community itself in the form of network grants, facilitating the everyday work of contributors, which is usually not supported at all in conventional arts endowment systems.

The process to come up with an ideal system of self-governance amongst the artists was challenging. Many members of the scene were skeptical. Critics feared that the system would lead to increased competition and hostilities between participants, favor well-marketed projects over substantiated ones or that too much trust is placed in as-yet-unproven software. Proponents of the idea cited its independent, democratic, open and non-bureaucratic tendencies as advantages, and stated that it was designed to reward collaboration.

In spring 2009 the City of Vienna started an external evaluation process that decided the future of the self-governed funding model. As a result, parts of the direct community voting mechanisms were replaced by a jury, which is being elected by the community.

netznetz was closed in 2011.

Coordinators 
January 2006-July 2006: Stefan Lutschinger
July 2006-September 2006: Johannes Grenzfurthner
September 2006-October 2006: Paul Böhm
November 2006-September 2007: Andreas Trawöger
September 2007-December 2007: Valie Göschl and Charlotte Zott
December 2007-December 2008: 4-headed coordination team (among others Andreas Leo Findeisen and Michael Zeltner)

Participating artists and collectives 
 0rf.at
 5uper.net
 Esel
 MACHFELD
 Metalab
 Monochrom
 renfah.net
 Quintessenz
 Ubermorgen
 Patrick Schabus
 Maria Krisper

Note: This is an incomplete listing which should not be taken to represent the netznetz community as a whole.

See also 
 Consensus decision-making
 Game theory

References

External links
NetzNetz Wiki
Option Democr@tor - Overview over currently discussed issues, decisions and structures in German
Diskussion 2004 bis 200x - Overview over currently discussed issues, decisions and structures in German

Austrian art